
Lago del Sambuco is a reservoir above Fusio, in the municipality of Lavizzara, Ticino, Switzerland. Its surface area is 1.11 km². The dam of Sambuco on the Maggia River was completed in 1956. Its maximum height is 130 m and length 363 m.

See also
List of lakes of Switzerland
List of mountain lakes of Switzerland

Sambuco, Lago del
Sambuco, Lago del
Sambuco